Backsliders and Apostates Will Burn is the second EP by American noise rock band The Austerity Program, released in 2010 through Hydra Head Records through vinyl, compact disc, and even Data DVD-R formats. For marketing, instead of making usual press kits, the band decided to use humorous ways to market the release of the record, such as writing a fake review written by an angry staff member of Hydra Head.

Marketing
As a joke, the duo wrote a fake review for the album that is supposed to sound as if it was written by an irate staff member of Hydra Head Records complaining about the lack of material found of the EP. The "review" was posted on the EP's bandcamp and Amazon.com page:

What does it sound like? You tell us, man. We haven't even cracked open the reference copies because what's the point? If it's anything like their last record (and they claim that it is, but "so much better" -- whatever, guys) it'll have a drum machine and some guitars and bass and that one guy will be singing and can I just tell you how mad I am that I am even stuck writing this thing?

The band also released a short film to help market the record. In it, the band hires a "professional producer" to help them record the record, only for him to kick the band out of the project and to completely ruin it.

Track listing

Personnel

Performers
Thad Calabrese - Bass
Justin Foley - Guitar, Vocals
Drum machine - everything else

Production
John Golden - Mastering
The Austerity Program - Music, Recording

References

2010 EPs
Hydra Head Records EPs
The Austerity Program albums